Slovinj Veliki  is a mountain in the municipality of Glamoč, Canton 10, Federation of Bosnia and Herzegovina, Bosnia and Herzegovina.
Mali Slovinj  is a mountain in the same municipality.

See also
List of mountains in Bosnia and Herzegovina

References

Mountains of Bosnia and Herzegovina